Dinis Carneiro Carvalho Cunha Lopes (born 25 December 1994) is a Portuguese footballer  who plays for F.C. Famalicão, as a midfielder.

Football career
On 23 July 2017, Lopes made his professional debut with Famalicão in a 2017–18 Taça da Liga match against Santa Clara.

References

External links

1994 births
Living people
Portuguese footballers
Association football midfielders
F.C. Famalicão players